The 2006–07 Meistriliiga season was the 17th season of the Meistriliiga, the top level of ice hockey in Estonia. Five teams participated in the league, and HK Stars Tallinn won the championship.

Regular season

Playoffs

Quarterfinals 
 Kohtla-Järve Viru Sputnik - Tartu Välk 494 0:2 (0:20, 4:22)
 Tallinna Eagles - Narva PSK 0:2 (4:5, 1:3)

Semifinals 
 Narva PSK - Tartu Välk 494 2:0 (3:2, 7:3)

Final 
 HK Stars Tallinn - Narva PSK 2:1 (1:7, 4:2, 3:2)

External links
Season on hockeyarchives.info

Meistriliiga
Meistriliiga
Meistriliiga (ice hockey) seasons